Jack El-Hai is an American journalist and author who focuses most of his work on the history of medicine, the history of science, and other historical topics.

Career
El-Hai graduated from Carleton College in 1979. He was the president of the American Society of Journalists and Authors. He has been a contributor to the Atlantic Monthly, the Washington Post Magazine, American Heritage, and other publications. El-Hai has also taught courses on nonfiction writing at the School of Journalism and Mass Communication and the Creative Writing Program of the University of Minnesota, the Split Rock Arts Program, the Mayo Clinic, and the Loft Literary Center. He has recently started teaching creative writing courses at Augsburg College.

Works
He is the author of a biography of Dr. Walter Freeman, The Lobotomist: A Maverick Medical Genius and His Tragic Quest to Rid the World of Mental Illness (2005, Wiley), The Nazi and the Psychiatrist, and Turbulent Air: A History of Northwest Airlines. His shorter works have appeared in The Atlantic, Wired, Scientific American Mind, The History Channel Magazine, and many other publications.

Awards and honors
In 2002, he was the winner of an outstanding medical article as recognized by the June Roth Memorial Fund.

Personal
El-Hai lives in Minneapolis with his wife and two daughters.

References 

American male journalists
Living people
Carleton College alumni
Year of birth missing (living people)